Louis V of Hesse-Darmstadt (24 September 1577 – 27 July 1626) was the Landgrave of Hesse-Darmstadt from 1596 to 1626.

Early life 
He was born on 24 September 1577 as the son of George I, Landgrave of Hesse-Darmstadt and Magdalene of Lippe, daughter Bernhard VIII, Count of Lippe.

Biography 
In 1604 he inherited a part of Hessen-Marburg after the death of Louis IV of Hesse-Marburg who was childless. The other half went to Maurice of Hesse-Kassel (or Hesse-Cassel), but since Maurice was a Calvinist, Ludwig claimed a right on the whole of Hesse-Marburg. Lutheran professors of the University of Marburg who refused to convert to Calvinism founded in 1607 the University of Gießen which was named Ludoviciana.

This led to a conflict during the Thirty Years' War, between Louis V, who stood on the side of the Emperor, and Maurice, who was on the side of the Protestants.  Hesse-Darmstadt suffered severely from the ravages from the Swedes during the conflict.

The Landgrave died in 1626 and he was succeeded by George II, Landgrave of Hesse-Darmstadt.

In 1722, Johann Georg Liebknecht, an astronomer at the University of Gießen, named a star, which he thought was a planet, Sidus Ludoviciana after Ludwig V.

Issue
Louis V married Magdalene of Brandenburg, daughter of John George, Elector of Brandenburg by his third wife, Elisabeth of Anhalt-Zerbst. They had issue:

 Elisabeth Magdalene of Hesse-Darmstadt (23 April 1600, Darmstadt – 9 June 1624, Montbéliard), who married Louis Frederick, Duke of Württemberg-Montbéliard.
 Anne Eleonore of Hesse-Darmstadt (30 July 1601 – 6 May 1659)
 Sofie Agnes of Hesse-Darmstadt (12 January 1604, Darmstadt – 8 September 1664, Hilpoltstein)
 George II, Landgrave of Hesse-Darmstadt (17 March 1605 – 11 June 1661)
 Juliane of Hesse-Darmstadt (14 April 1606, Darmstadt – 15 January 1659 Hanover)
 Amalie of Hesse-Darmstadt (20 June 1607 – 11 September 1627)
 John, Landgrave of Hesse-Braubach (17 June 1609, Darmstadt – 1 April 1651, Ems)
 Henry of Hesse-Darmstadt (1 April 1612, Darmstadt – 21 October 1629)
 Hedwig of Hesse-Darmstadt (22 June 1613, Darmstadt – 2 March 1614)
 Louis of Hesse-Darmstadt (12 September 1614, Darmstadt – 16 September 1614)
 Frederick of Hesse-Darmstadt (28 February 1616, Darmstadt – 19 February 1682)

Ancestry

References
 Wikisource: Allgemeine Deutsch Biographie "Ludwig V." (in German)

|-

1577 births
1626 deaths
Nobility from Darmstadt
Landgraves of Hesse-Darmstadt